The Forth Bridge is a railway bridge over the Firth of Forth in Scotland, opened in 1890.

Forth Bridge may also refer to:

Bridges 
 Kincardine Bridge, opened in 1936
 Forth Road Bridge, opened in 1964
 Clackmannanshire Bridge, opened in 2008
 Queensferry Crossing, opened in 2017

Other 
 The Forth Road Bridge, 1965 film
 Operation Forth Bridge, the UK's national plan following the death of Prince Philip, Duke of Edinburgh

See also
 Fourth Bridge